Ascalenia acaciella is a moth in the family Cosmopterigidae. It is found on the Canary Islands and Malta, North Africa, the Near and Middle East and east to Afghanistan and Pakistan. The habitat consists of dry or desert-like areas.

The larvae feed on the flower heads of Acacia species, including Acacia farnesiana, Acacia karroo and Acacia tortilis. Pupation occurs amongst the flowers in a transparent cocoon covered with frass. Adults fly almost year-round, probably in several generations.

References

Moths described in 1915
Ascalenia
Moths of Africa
Moths of Asia